Wyatt Michael Langford (born November 15, 2001) is an American college baseball outfielder for the Florida Gators.

Career
Langford attended Trenton High School in Trenton, Florida. He played baseball, football and basketball at Trenton. In 2019, he won the 2019 Perfect Game National Home Run Derby. Langford committed to the University of Florida to play college baseball.

As a freshman at Florida in 2021, Langford played in four games and had one hit over four at-bats. In 2022, he started all 66 games and hit 26 home runs, which tied Matt LaPorta for most home runs in season by a Gators player. He finished the season, hitting.356/.447/.719 with 63 runs batted in (RBI). After the season, he played for the United States collegiate national team during the summer. He also played in nine games for the Peninsula Pilots of the Coastal Plain League.

Langford entered the 2023 season as one of the top prospects for the 2023 Major League Baseball draft and the potential first overall pick.

References

External links

2001 births
Living people
Baseball players from Florida
Baseball outfielders
Florida Gators baseball players
Peninsula Pilots players